Hajdúság is a historical and geographical region in Hungary, located in the Great Hungarian Plain around Debrecen. It consists of six hajdú towns, named Hajdúböszörmény, Hajdúdorog, Hajdúnánás, Hajdúhadház, Hajdúszoboszló and Vámospércs.

History 
The region was established by István Bocskai in the 17th century, who invited Hajdús to his domains. Hajdús were Hungarian mercenary soldiers, mercantiles and cattle drovers in the Great Hungarian Plain, during the Ottoman wartimes Hungarian peasants also joined to the group. After settling down they got collective nobility. It was an autonomous region (means "Hajdú District") until 1876 when it became part of Hajdú County (now Hajdú-Bihar County).

References 
Antal Papp: Magyarország (Hungary), Panoráma, Budapest, 1982, p. 860, pp. 477–478

Historical regions in Hungary
Geography of Hungary
Geography of Hajdú-Bihar County